Ranger Body Armor (RBA) is a US military-issue ballistic vest that was designed for, and used chiefly by, US Army 75th Ranger Regiment operators ("Rangers") in the 1990s and 2000s. The RBA system has since been replaced by other specialized body armor systems adopted by the United States Special Operations Command (USSOCOM).

Ranger Body Armor (RBA) was designed by the United States Army Soldier Systems Center in Natick, Massachusetts to meet the operational needs of the 75th Ranger Regiment. RBA was first manufactured by Protective Materials Company, then HS Manufacturing, and then Ceradyne.

History
Early versions of RBA (the first variant, which featured only the front ballistic armor plate and no rear armor plate) first saw active frontline service in 1993, being used in combat in Operation Gothic Serpent (22 August 1993 to 13 October 1993), when Rangers of Task Force Ranger first arrived in Mogadishu, Somalia. There, it was used by the Rangers of B Company and Command and Control, 3rd Battalion, 75th Ranger Regiment. The early RBA used only a front ballistic plate for protection from small arms (rifle) fire; this did not protect some of the Rangers in Somalia from serious injury or death, such as Sgt James Joyce, who was killed by a gunshot wound to his back.

During the 1990s, RBA was used by Rangers in the Balkans and in Haiti. In 1996, around 350 vests were sent to soldiers deployed in the former Yugoslavia.

In 1996 members of the USAF Security Forces assigned to the 91st Missile Wing at Minot AFB, ND also received the vests to replace their PASGT vests.

RBA was worn by some U.S. Army Soldiers who served in Kosovo, including Soldiers from C Company, 1-187th Infantry, 101st Airborne Division; 3-504th PIR, 82nd Airborne Division; A Company 1/36 INF (MECH), 1st Armored Division; and A Company, 1-26th Infantry, 1st Infantry Division.

In 1998, 1st Squadron, 1st Cavalry Regiment (1-1 CAV), 1st Armored Division's Soldiers were equipped with RBA during SFOR's Operation Joint Guard and Operation Joint Forge in Bosnia and Herzegovina. Due to the heavy weight, RBA vests were always kept in the back compartment of vehicles and soldiers always used PASGT vests during their peacekeeping duty.

Some soldiers from the 173rd Airborne Brigade used RBA protection during Operation Northern Delay (26 March 2003) in Kurdistan. About 1,000 parachutists from the 173rd AB Bde jumped into the Kurdish-controlled area in northern Iraq to open a northern front for U.S. forces after the refusal by Turkey.

Development
RBA consists of two main components: flexible soft armor vest panels, and, one or two rigid ceramic plates, both of which provide some ballistic protection to the upper torso.

The flexible soft armor vest panels consist of an aramid (Kevlar KM2) filler encased in a nylon Woodland camouflage-printed carrier. The vest weighs approximately 8 pounds in size medium, and provides ballistic protection to Threat Level IIIA according to the NIJ Body Armor Classification. It also provides fragmentation protection similar to that of the Personnel Armor System for Ground Troops (PASGT) vest.

The 8-pound Ceramic Upgrade Plates are fabricated of  aluminium oxide ceramic tiles. When the upgrade plates are inserted into the pockets of the vest, it protects an approximate  area from 5.56×45mm NATO and 7.62×51mm NATO full metal jacket rounds. When using the two standard aluminium oxide ceramic plates, a RBA vest weighs 11.4 kg (25.1 lbs).

At least two major variations of RBA were produced. The first variant used only a front rigid ballistic armor plate and an unmodified nylon fabric carrier. The second variant used both a front and a back ballistic armor plate, added a small storage pocket to the front ballistic plate storage pocket, and featured nylon equipment retention straps on each shoulder.

Fielding
RBA was type classification (TC) limited procurement-urgent (LPU). RBA is available for purchase through General Services Administration (GSA) contract GS-07F-6041A, Protective Materials, Inc. The flexible soft armor vest is available in three sizes: medium, large, and extra-large. The negotiated cost through the GSA contract for a size medium vest and plate set is US$738.

Users

References

Body armor
Ballistic vests
Military equipment of the United States